Year 1130 (MCXXX) was a common year starting on Wednesday (link will display the full calendar) of the Julian calendar.

Events 
 January 22 – Jin–Song Wars: Jin forces take Hangzhou.
 February 4 – Jin–Song Wars: Jin forces take Shaoxing.
 February 14 – Pope Innocent II succeeds Pope Honorius II, as the 164th pope. Other factions (including Roger II of Sicily), however, support Anacletus II as pope, leading to the papal schism of 1130, and Innocent flees to France.
 March 26 – Magnus IV and his uncle Harald Gille become joint kings of Norway, starting the civil war era in Norway.
 April 24 – Jin–Song Wars: Battle of Huangtiandang – Naval forces of the Song Dynasty trap Wuzhu's Jin troops in the city for 48 days.
 December 25 – Antipope Anacletus crowns Roger II of Sicily king.
 Approximate date – Magnus the Strong is deposed as king of Götaland, when Sverker the Elder proclaims himself king of Sweden.

Births 
 Eustace IV of Boulogne, a Count of Boulogne and the son and heir of King Stephen of England (approximate date; d. 1153)
 Daoji, Chinese Buddhist monk (d. 1207)
 Baldwin III of Jerusalem (d. 1162)
 Richard de Clare, 2nd Earl of Pembroke (d. 1176)
 Zhu Xi, Chinese Confucian scholar (d. 1200)

Deaths 

 February 13 – Pope Honorius II (b. 1060)
 March 26 – King Sigurd I of Norway (b. c. 1090)
 October 16 – Pedro González de Lara, Castilian magnate
 November 11 – Teresa of León, Countess of Portugal, Portuguese regent (b. 1080)
 date unknown
Brahmadeva, Indian mathematician (b. 1060)
 Maud, 2nd Countess of Huntingdon (b. 1074)
 Robert of Bellême, 3rd Earl of Shrewsbury (b. 1052)
 Alam al-Malika, Yemenite politician
 Diemoth, German nun and writer (b. 1060) (approximately)

References